Kalev Kukk (born 3 June 1951, Tallinn) is an Estonian geographer and politician. Kukk was Estonia's Minister of Roads and Communications (1995–1996). He was also a member of VII Riigikogu.

References

Living people
1951 births
Estonian geographers
Members of the Riigikogu, 1992–1995
Members of the Riigikogu, 1995–1999
Members of the Riigikogu, 1999–2003
Members of the Riigikogu, 2003–2007